Deal is a 2008 poker drama film starring Burt Reynolds, Bret Harrison and Shannon Elizabeth. It follows the former poker player tutoring a younger player (Harrison). The film's climax is a fictional World Poker Tour championship.

World Poker Tour commentators, Mike Sexton, Vince Van Patten and Courtney Friel played themselves. A number of other professional poker players and poker-playing celebrities, including Elizabeth, Jennifer Tilly, Phil Laak, Antonio Esfandiari, Greg Raymer, Chris Moneymaker and Isabelle Mercier are in the cast.

Plot
Alex Stillman (Bret Harrison) is a law student who plays poker online and in home games.  He competes in an online tournament where the final table is played live on TV.  Alex reaches the final table, but is eliminated first after being outmatched by professional player Karen "The Razor" Jones.  The final table broadcast is watched by retired player Tommy Vinson (Burt Reynolds), who feels that Alex has potential as a player but could use his help.  Vinson tracks Alex down at a cash game and offers him his business card, which Alex refuses until Tommy impresses him by reading his last hand.

Alex finally calls Tommy and spends a few days with him watching old videotapes of poker players and learning about tells and reading players.  Tommy offers the kid a deal, he will stake Alex in poker games and they will split his winnings 50/50.  When Alex asks why Tommy doesn't just play himself, he reveals that he hasn't played a hand in twenty years.  After going broke and nearly losing his house and wife, Tommy agreed to never again play a hand at the risk of his wife leaving him.  Tommy takes Alex to Las Vegas to play in a high-stakes cash game.  He buys Alex in and watches the kid take a few beatings and lose money.  Tommy pulls him off the table and reveals that Alex has a tell, which he corrects.  Alex turns the game around and ends up cashing out ahead.  Tommy suggests Alex relax a little and gets him to approach a beautiful woman at the bar named Michelle (Shannon Elizabeth).  Alex awkwardly approaches her and convinces her to go on a date with him, and she spends the night with him.

Tommy wants to take Alex to Louisiana to play in a poker tournament, but Alex is supposed to start his job at his father's law firm.  Alex convinces his dad to give him a few extra days under the pretext of taking a trip with his friend.  Tommy tells his wife he has to go to Cleveland for work and the pair head to the tournament.  On the first day, Alex does really well and builds up a chip lead.  Overnight, Tommy warns Alex that the other players will try to keep him awake with distractions such as crank phone calls and knocks at the door.  Alex doesn't listen and loses sleep to the distractions, resulting in him busting out of the tournament.  Upon returning home, Tommy is confronted by his wife Helen about the money he's been using.  He admits to bankrolling Alex but swears he hasn't played a hand himself.  Unmoved, Helen packs her things and leaves Tommy.

Tommy takes Alex back to Las Vegas for another tournament, during which he tries to reconnect with Michelle but she doesn't return his calls.  Alex does well at first but starts getting flustered when he runs into another tough female opponent.  Alex finally finds his stride, finishing the tournament in the money and making $120,000.  Michelle finally calls Alex back, and the two spend the night together.  Alex tries to convince her to spend more time with him, but she tells him her father is in town and she has to leave.  Later that night, while celebrating his win with Tommy, he sees Michelle with another man and realizes she is a prostitute.  Tommy tacitly admits to hiring her to help Alex relax, and an enraged Alex storms off.  The next morning, Alex leaves Tommy his share of the winnings at the hotel desk and tells him never to talk to him again.

Alex returns home to his angry parents, who know he's been playing poker rather than work.  When his father reminds him who paid for his law school, Alex throws his $60,000 at him.  Shocked at the money Alex has made, his parents reluctantly agree to let him compete in the World Poker Tour tournament in a few weeks.  Tommy, deciding he has nothing to lose, enters the tournament as well.  The two play for several days, with Alex quickly building up a chip lead and Tommy slowly grinding his way up until both players reach the final table.  That evening, Helen returns to Tommy at his hotel and apologizes for making him stay away from poker for so long.  Alex's parents also arrive, finally supporting their son's poker playing.  The next day, they both eliminate several players until it's down to just the two of them.  In the final hand, Tommy busts Alex out with a pocket pair of jacks.

Later in the evening, Tommy confronts Alex to ask about his last hand.  Alex confirms Tommy's suspicion that he had a lower pair than Tommy.  In a flashback, we see that Alex actually folded the winning hand in order to let Tommy have the title he wanted for so long.

Cast

Production
The World Poker Tour set was shipped to New Orleans for filming.

During the production, Charles Durning treated the cast and crew to a tour of the National World War II Museum in New Orleans and recounted his own World War II experience at Normandy during the D-Day invasion and in the Battle of the Bulge, where he was wounded and taken prisoner.

Reception
Rotten Tomatoes gives the film an approval rating of 3% based on 35 reviews, with an average rating of 3.20/10. The site's critical consensus reads: "Employing multiple cinematic clichés and milking stale performances, Deal proves inadequate for even the lowly regarded poker movie genre." Metacritic gives it a weighted average rating of 35 out of 100 based on 9 reviews, indicating "generally unfavourable reviews".

Deal earned a Razzie Award nomination for Burt Reynolds as Worst Supporting Actor.

References

External links
 
 
 
 
 

2008 films
American drama films
Films directed by Gil Cates Jr.
Films shot in New Orleans
Metro-Goldwyn-Mayer films
Films about poker
2000s English-language films
2000s American films